The Jewry Wall is a substantial ruined wall of 2nd-century Roman masonry, with two large archways, in Leicester, England. It stands alongside St Nicholas' Circle and St Nicholas' Church. The wall gives its name to the adjacent Jewry Wall Museum.

Etymology
The origin of the name of the wall (first recorded ) is debated. It is unlikely to relate to Leicester's medieval Jewish community, which was never large and was expelled from the town by Simon de Montfort in 1231. One theory that has achieved widespread currency is that the name bears some relation to the 24 "jurats" (meaning "sworn men", and roughly equivalent to aldermen) of early medieval Leicester, the senior members of the Corporation, who were said to have met, as a "jury", in the town churchyard—possibly that of St Nicholas. However, it seems more likely that the name derives from a broader folk belief attributing mysterious ruins of unknown origin to Jews. Such attributions are found at a number of other sites elsewhere in England and other parts of Europe.

Description
The wall is an impressive example of standing Roman masonry. It dates to approximately 125–130 AD. It is among the largest pieces of surviving civil Roman architecture in Britain, and is comparable to the "Old Work" at Wroxeter. The structure comprises alternate bands of Roman brick and coursed masonry, of local granite, limestone and sandstone.

The wall lies immediately to the west of St Nicholas' Church, which includes in its late Saxon and early medieval fabric much reused Roman brick and masonry.

The remains of the Roman town's public baths, immediately west of the wall, were excavated in four seasons from 1936 to 1939 by Kathleen Kenyon. The wall and some of the foundations of the baths are now laid out to public view. They are adjoined by a 1960s building housing the Jewry Wall Museum (and formerly Vaughan College), which stands on the remainder of the baths site (including the site of the three furnaces). The museum contains excellent examples of Roman mosaics, painted wall plaster and other Roman and Iron Age artefacts from sites around Leicester.

The wall was taken into state care in 1920 and is now the responsibility of English Heritage. The wall itself is a Grade I listed building; its wider site, including the adjacent remains of the baths and St Nicholas' Church, forms a scheduled monument.

Function and context
The wall appears to have formed the long western side of a large rectangular basilica-like structure. The precise character and function of this building has been a matter of much debate. 18th- and early 19th-century antiquaries tended to identify it as a Roman or British temple, sometimes said to have been dedicated to the god Janus. The ruin was also occasionally identified as "part of a bath". For much of the 19th century it was widely believed to have been a town gate, though this was suggested by neither its structure nor its location. This interpretation still appeared as fact in the generally authoritative Victoria County History as late as 1907. The prevailing view in the early 20th century was that the ruin was part of the town basilica.

When she began her excavations in the late 1930s, Kenyon initially thought the overall site was that of the town forum (of which the basilica would have formed a part). Although she modified her views when she uncovered the remains of the baths, she continued to believe that the area had originally been laid out as the forum, with the Jewry Wall the west wall of the basilica, but argued that in a second phase of building, only about 20 years later, the site had been converted to public baths. This interpretation was abandoned when, in a series of excavations undertaken between 1961 and 1972, the true remains of the forum were firmly identified a block further east (Insula XXII). The Jewry Wall was then identified as the wall of the palaestra (gymnasium) of the baths complex, and this continues to be the most commonly accepted view, given in the official scheduled monument descriptions and in the interpretive material on site.

There are still a number of unanswered questions, however, and the issue remains open.

Jewry Wall Museum 

The Jewry Wall Museum faces the Jewry Wall ruins, and houses artefacts from Iron Age, Roman, and medieval Leicester. The building is Grade II listed and below Vaughan College, home to Leicester University's Institute for Lifelong-Learning. The museum is run by Leicester City Council and is free to enter.

In 2004, as part of a scheme of cost-cutting by Leicester City Council, it was proposed that the Jewry Wall Museum's hours be reduced. An interest group was created in response, and the 'Friends of Jewry Wall Museum' have been actively promoting the museum since. Nevertheless, Leicester City Council reduced the museum's hours to save money, and it is closed for several months over the winter. Councillor John Mugglestone rationalised the decision at the time, saying: "At Jewry Wall, we have more curators than visitors".

The museum was threatened again in 2011, when Leicester City Council announced plans to close the museum (along with two others in the city) to save money. This decision was overturned following a motion by the City Council's backbench Labour councillors, led by former Labour Council leader Ross Willmott.

In popular culture
The Jewry Wall features as the "Old Bathhouse" in the 2020 video game Assassin's Creed Valhalla.

See also 

 Ratae Corieltauvorum
 Roman Britain
 Roman client kingdoms in Britain
 Governors of Roman Britain
 Romano-British culture
 Sub-Roman Britain
 Roman sites in the United Kingdom
 Roman sites in Great Britain
 End of Roman rule in Britain
 History of the British Isles
 Britannia (disambiguation)

References

Bibliography
: pdf available at

External links

 

 
 

Buildings and structures completed in the 2nd century
Leicester
Roman Leicester
Archaeological sites in Leicestershire
History of Leicester
Buildings and structures in Leicester
Tourist attractions in Leicestershire
Walls in England
Grade I listed walls
Roman sites in England
Grade I listed buildings in Leicestershire
Museums in Leicester
Scheduled monuments in Leicester
Archaeological museums in England
Museums of ancient Rome in the United Kingdom
History museums in Leicestershire